Louisville City Football Club is an American professional soccer club based in Louisville, Kentucky. The team plays in the USL Championship, known through the 2018 season as the United Soccer League (USL), which is currently the second tier of the American soccer pyramid.

The club was founded in 2014 after Orlando City's USL team franchise rights were relocated to Louisville and played their first USL season in 2015. After reaching the Eastern Conference finals of the USL playoffs in both its first two seasons, the club went on to win the 2017 USL Cup in only its third season of existence. In 2018, they repeated as champions, becoming the first team to win back-to-back USL Cup championships. In 2019, they became the first team in USL history to play in three consecutive USL Cup Finals, but they fell just shy of their third championship.

History

In early 2014, the owners of Orlando City's USL team, encouraged by minority owner Wayne Estopinal, met with city of Louisville officials to explore moving the team that would be displaced by Orlando's new MLS franchise. Estopinal became the majority owner and the club formally announced their relocation to Louisville in June 2014. Orlando City SC held a minority ownership stake in Louisville City FC during the latter's inaugural campaign in 2015, and Louisville City featured as the Lions' USL affiliate team.

The club maintained the colors of the Orlando City franchise, and installed former Orlando City player-coach James O'Connor as its first manager.

In their first season in 2015, the club finished second in the league in points. In the playoffs they made it to the Eastern Conference finals before falling 1-0 to eventual league champions Rochester Rhinos. The team won two matches in the 2015 US Open Cup but lost in the fourth round to the Chicago Fire of the MLS in extra time. 

Beginning with the 2016 season, Orlando City SC ended its affiliation with Louisville City and began operating the Orlando City B USL team.

In 2016, Louisville City placed second overall in the league for the second consecutive season, and they also finished their season losing in the Eastern Conference Finals, this time on penalties to the MLS affiliate and eventual league champions New York Red Bulls II. This marked the second season in a row that Louisville fell to the eventual league champions in the conference finals. In the 2016 US Open Cup, the team only won one match before losing in the third round to Indy Eleven of the NASL.

The 2017 season began with the United Soccer League officially moving from the third tier to the second on the United States Soccer Pyramid, solidifying Louisville City and the rest of the league as the second biggest in the country. This season also saw Louisville bring home the league championship for the first time. The team placed first in the eastern conference and second overall. In the playoffs, they almost fell to the New York Red Bulls II on penalties in the Eastern Conference Finals for the second straight season, but they narrowly squeaked out a win. This was the third straight season that Louisville would make it to the conference finals. In the final match, they defeated the Swope Park Rangers, an MLS affiliate, 1-0 to lift their first ever league championship. In the US Open Cup they fell in the third round for the second straight season, this time to fellow USL team and main rival FC Cincinnati.

In the summer of 2018, James O'Connor stepped back as manager in order to take the head coaching position at MLS club Orlando City SC. James O'Connor left the team with a 71–28–26 record and a USL Cup win from the previous season, along with the first ever franchise win over an MLS team against the New England Revolution in the 2018 U.S. Open Cup Tournament. The team was then coached under the triumvirate of three players, George Davis IV, Paolo DelPiccolo, and Luke Spencer. On August 2, 2018, John Hackworth was appointed as the team's second-ever head coach. On November 8, the team made USL history by becoming the first team to repeat as champions of the league. The team defeated Phoenix Rising FC 1–0.

On November 30, 2018, minority owner and key founder, Wayne Estopinal, died in a plane crash on the way from the Louisville area to Chicago.

The following season, Louisville City made it to their third consecutive USL championship game but failed to complete the first ever "threepeat", falling 3–1 against Real Monarchs SLC, the USL affiliate of the MLS' Real Salt Lake.

On January 13, 2020, it was announced that James O'Connor would be returning to the organization after being fired from Orlando City SC in October 2019. This time he will serve as executive vice president of development where he will oversee the establishment of the team's youth soccer academy. O'Connor will also help with hiring staff for the NWSL's Racing Louisville in 2021.

Hackworth and the club mutually agreed to terminate his contract on April 27, 2021. Technical director Danny Cruz was appointed as interim head coach.

Stadium

Louisville Slugger Field (2015–2019) 

From the club's inaugural 2015 season through 2019, home games were played at Louisville Slugger Field. It is a multi-use facility that serves as the primary home of the Louisville Bats, Triple-A affiliate of the Cincinnati Reds. Though Slugger Field officially seats 13,131 for baseball games, an attendance of 8,000 was considered a soccer sellout due to limited viewing in the stadium's current baseball diamond configuration. The pitcher's mound at Slugger Field was retrofitted with a retractable jack to allow a level playing surface for soccer games prior to the start of the inaugural season.

Lynn Family Stadium 

In April 2017, the ownership group announced that it had an option to purchase five adjacent parcels of land, totaling , in the Butchertown neighborhood just to the east of Slugger Field for a mixed-use project that would include a 10,000-seat soccer stadium.  The plan initially called for the stadium to be expandable to 20,000 seats, and the overall complex would also include offices, retail space, and a hotel.

On September 22, 2017, Louisville Metro mayor Greg Fischer announced a stadium deal that calls for the merged city–county government to borrow $30 million in order to purchase the land, with Louisville City investors responsible for developing the site and repaying about half of the borrowed funds. While the initial capacity of the stadium did not change, the revised plan allowed for possible expansion to 25,000, and it was also revealed that the overall plan could include a second hotel.

On October 26, 2017, Louisville Metro Council voted overwhelmingly to approve the stadium deal shortly after the ownership group secured $130 million in private financing for the overall project; the council voted at the same time to apply to the Kentucky General Assembly for a tax-increment financing district for the project. The stadium is currently projected to open in March 2020, satisfying a USL mandate that all franchises play in soccer-specific stadiums by the 2020 season.

Groundbreaking for the stadium was held on June 28, 2018, with an initial capacity of around 14,000 fans with permanent seating for 11,700. On August 5, 2019, the club announced that the stadium would be known as Lynn Family Stadium. The stadium bears the name of Dr. Mark Lynn, an optometrist who owned the Louisville-area franchises of the national optical retailer Visionworks. Louisville City's stadium is the second soccer venue in the city to bear the Lynn name; he and his wife Cindy are the namesakes of the University of Louisville's soccer stadium. Its capacity is officially 15,304, with enough chair-back seating for 11,600.

Lynn Family Stadium opened in 2020, with LouCity's July 12 match to Pittsburgh Riverhounds serving as the first game. In 2021, COVID-19 pandemic restrictions were lifted, allowing Lynn Family Stadium to host its first full-capacity match on June 13 against Memphis 901 FC.

Supporters
In 2013, a group of soccer fans in Louisville formed a supporters group, The Coopers, to build support for professional soccer in Louisville. The Coopers take their name from Louisville's bourbon distilling tradition, where coopers make barrels that are used to age bourbon and give it a distinct flavor.

In January 2014, a potential local ownership group invited the owners of Orlando City Soccer Club to Louisville to meet with The Coopers. After the meeting, Orlando City owner Phil Rawlins noted that The Coopers were already a "great supporters group" and predicted that a professional team would be successful in Louisville.

Rivalries
Louisville City's main league and regional rivals are FC Cincinnati, Saint Louis FC, and Indy Eleven.

Kings' Cup 

Louisville City FC played and won its first professional match 2–0 against Saint Louis FC on opening day of the 2015 USL season. Since then the two sides have fostered a friendly rivalry for the Kings' Cup. The rivalry went dormant when Saint Louis FC dissolved in October 2020 due to the announcement of a future St Louis MLS expansion team controlled by competing ownership.

Dirty River Derby 

The rivalry with FC Cincinnati for the Dirty River Derby, less commonly known as "River Cities Cup", was one of the most hotly contested matches in lower division US soccer until FC Cincinnati moved to MLS in 2018. The two cities are located a mere 100 miles apart from each other along the Ohio River. Due to this proximity, the matches tend to draw well and often featured aggressive play for local bragging rights.  The Dirty River Derby, as far as being a divisional rivalry, ended following the 2018 season with FC Cincinnati's move to MLS.

LIPAFC 
Louisville City FC first played against another regional club, the Indy Eleven, during the 2015 U.S. Open Cup, in which Louisville City won, 2–0.  The two clubs would meet again in a series of friendlies the following two seasons, as well as the 2016 U.S. Open Cup, where Indy would defeat Louisville by a score of 2–1.  The arrival of the Eleven to the United Soccer League in 2018 resulted in the two becoming divisional rivals, and was given the unusual title of "Louisville-Indianapolis Proximity Association Football Contest", or "LIPAFC" during the season by both clubs on social media.

Colors and badge

The team maintained the original colors of the Orlando City franchise; purple, gold and white. The first proposed team crest featured a golden Fleur-de-lis atop of a purple bourbon barrel.  However, due to fan outcry this design was abandoned and a design contest was held to select a new crest.  The winning design consists of a purple Fleur-de-lis recessed into a golden bourbon barrel at the bottom with a partial skyline of the City of Louisville at the top.  The partial skyline includes Preston Pointe, Aegon Center, PNC Tower, and the Humana Building.

On December 16, 2019, Louisville City unveiled a new badge, using the "LouCity" name and "combining elements from the traditional city of Louisville flag with LouCity’s Signature Purple. The new crest will incorporate Oak Char Black and Kentucky Limestone Grey into the official colors of the club." However, it lasted just three days until another outcry caused "LouCity" to abandon their brand-new badge on December 19, 2019. In a statement, club president Brad Estes said, "(O)ur recent brand rollout has failed you. We had the best intentions, but we lost sight of our responsibility to engage you in the process. We have stopped production on merchandise with the new crest and have opened dialogue with supporter group leadership about how to improve our club’s branding and crest.”

On November 17, 2020, Louisville City unveiled a new permanent badge. The new logo was designed by Matthew Wolff.

Sponsorship

Academy 
They have a pre-professional team Louisville City U-23 in USL League Two.

On March 9, 2020, the team announced the development of their youth academy, which is the first professional academy of its kind in Louisville and the state of Kentucky. The academy will feature two teams, one for boys and one for girls, starting at age 8 and continuing for ages under 19. The goal is to provide opportunities for players to be seen by professional teams along with collegiate ones.

On March 25, 2020, the team announced that the youth academy will become a member of the Elite Club National League. Louisville City is the first team involved with the ECNL in Kentucky. The teams of every age (8 to under 19) will compete with other ECNL members to qualify for the playoffs in the league.

The Youth Academy will play at the Champion's Park. This complex was approved for a $12 million renovation on March 5, 2020, and is funded by Louisville City FC. The complex will include three seasonal grass fields and four turf fields available for year-round use. The complex will serve as a home for youth soccer in the city and will also be where the upcoming NWSL team will practice. The site is planned to be ready for play by Spring of 2021.

Players and staff

Current roster

Out on loan

Front office
 John Neace – Chairman
 James O'Connor – President
 Brandon Morris – VP of Operations

Technical staff
  Danny Cruz – Head Coach & Technical Director
  Simon Bird – Assistant Coach
  Mario Sanchez – Assistant Coach
  Scott Budnick – Goalkeeping Coach

Team records
All information in this section as of November 8, 2022

Year-by-year

This is a partial list of the last six seasons completed by the club. For the full season-by-season history, see List of Louisville City FC seasons.

1. Avg. attendance include statistics from league matches only.
2. Top goalscorer(s) includes all goals scored in league, league playoffs, U.S. Open Cup, CONCACAF Champions League, FIFA Club World Cup, and other competitive continental matches.

Head coaches

^ Includes USL regular season, USL Playoffs, U.S. Open Cup. Excludes friendlies. ‡ Luke Spencer, Paolo DelPiccolo, & George Davis IV appointed joint interim head coaches. Commonly known as "The Triumvirate".

Attendance average

Player career records

Appearances

Goals

Assists

Honors
USL Championship

USL Cup
Winners (2):  2017, 2018
Runners-up (2):  2019, 2022
 USL Regular Season 
Runners-up (4):  2015, 2016, 2017, 2022
USL Eastern Conference
Winners (Playoffs) (4):  2017, 2018, 2019, 2022
Winners (Regular season) (3):  2017, 2020, 2022

Other
Kings Cup
Champions  (6):  2015, 2016, 2017, 2018, 2019, 2020
Dirty River Derby
Champions  (2):  2017, 2018

League honors
Most Valuable Player
Matt Fondy : 2015
Defender of the Year
Bryan Burke : 2015
Goalkeeper of the Year
Ben Lundt : 2020
Young Player of the Year
Jonathan Gómez : 2021
Comeback Player of the Year
Elijah Wynder: 2022
Golden Boot
Matt Fondy : 2015 (22 Goals)
Cameron Lancaster: 2018 (25 Goals)
Golden Glove
Kyle Morton : 2022
Assists Champion
Bryan Burke : 2015 (10 Assists)
USL Cup Final MVP
Paolo DelPiccolo : 2017
Luke Spencer : 2018
USL All-League 1st Team
Bryan Burke : 2015
Matt Fondy : 2015
Paco Craig : 2017, 2018
Cameron Lancaster: 2018, 2020
Ben Lundt : 2020
Sean Totsch : 2020, 2021, 2022
Devon Williams : 2020
Jonathan Gómez : 2021

See also
 Sports in Louisville, Kentucky

References

External links

Pro soccer is coming: Louisville FC to begin play in 2015 (archived)
Orlando City's USL franchise to rebrand, relocate to Louisville

 
Articles with hCards
Association football clubs established in 2014
2014 establishments in Kentucky
USL Championship teams
Soccer clubs in Kentucky